Sabriston (formerly: Frunze) is a jamoat in north-western Tajikistan. It is part of the city of Istaravshan in Sughd Region. The jamoat has a total population of 16,822 (2015). It consists of 3 villages: Rugund (the seat), Vogat and Yakkatol.

References

Populated places in Sughd Region
Jamoats of Tajikistan